Sulfur tetrachloride is an inorganic compound with chemical formula SCl4. It has only been obtained as an unstable pale yellow solid.  The corresponding SF4 is a stable, useful reagent.

Preparation and structure
It is obtained by treating sulfur dichloride with chlorine at 193 K:

It melts with simultaneous decomposition above −20 °C.

Its solid structure is uncertain. It is probably the salt SCl3+Cl−, since related salts are known with noncoordinating anions.  In contrast to this tetrachloride, SF4 is a neutral molecule.

Reactions
It decomposes above −30 °C (242 K) to sulfur dichloride and chlorine.

It hydrolyzes readily:

Sulfur tetrachloride reacts with water, producing hydrogen chloride and sulfur dioxide through the hydrolysis process.  Thionyl chloride is an implied intermediate.

 Oxidized by nitric acid:

References 

Sulfur chlorides
Hypervalent molecules